Economy of Washington may refer to:

 Economy of Washington (state)
 Economy of Washington, D.C.